A Profound Waste of Time is a British contemporary video game magazine. Crowdfunded through Kickstarters, the magazine is self-published by freelance graphic designer Caspian Whistler. The campaign for the first issue in 2016 raised £39,000; only two issues have been published, and a third is being crowdfunded. A Profound Waste of Time has received positive reviews from journalists.

Publication history 
Freelance graphic designer Caspian Whistler began making video game zines while studying at University of the Arts London. Exposed to many quality print publications for other areas of the arts, Whistler felt that video game magazines were "bleak" in comparison. He was inspired to create "something celebratory and optimistic" to recapture his love for video games. In an interview with Creative Review, Whistler said that he intended to move away "more reactionary" and mainstream aspects of video game journalism such as review scores and exclusives through a print format, enabling a "different kind" of gaming discussion. He also believed that discussion around the emotional aspects of games was lacking.

Whistler began A Profound Waste of Time (APWOT) while studying graphic design at the Chelsea College of Art as part of a project about zines and counterculture. Although Whistler initially wrote and designed his new side-project himself, he was surprised by the positive response after he posted images of the project on a forum. In 2016 he began crowdfunding the publication of the first issue of A Profound Waste of Time on Kickstarter with the aim of £20,000, raising £39,000. The second issue was released five years later in 2021 after its Kickstarter campaign raised £62,165. Another campaign for reprints of both issues raised over £89,000 sixteen days before closure. Both issues have special editions. A third issue is currently being funded by a Kickstarter campaign and is available for preorder.

Contents 
A Profound Waste of Time is a "gaming magazine printed on high-quality paper stock". The magazine has a focus on illustrations, design and words from a variety of different contributors, and does not have any screenshots. Its design was consulted on by Leo Field, it uses various types of printing and commissions various artists; the first issue features cover art of Shovel Knight (2014) by Dan Mumford. Whistler focused on using the physical nature of the magazine to its full effect, incorporating booklet inserts, foldouts, tip-ins and holographic covers. Issues include interviews and in-depth feature articles, and the second is almost 200 pages long. Special editions also have effects such as glow-in-the-dark and rainbow effects; the special edition of the third issue will have a thermochromic ink layer.

Known contributors and artists

Issue 1 
From 

 Tommy Refenes
 Rami Ismail
 Adrian Bauer
 Adam Heart
 Temmie Chang
 Kat Brewster
 Hannah Nicklin
 Adam Tierney
 Dant Rambo
 Dennis Wedin, co-founder of Dennaton Games
 Ojiro Fumoto, developer of Downwell (2015)
 Ashly Burch 
 Toby Fox
 Jake Kaufman
 John ‘JJSignal’ James, director of 2064: Read Only Memories (2015)
 Jonathan Holmes 
 Dan Mumford (cover artist)

Issue 2 
From 

 Amanda Yeo
 Keita Takahashi
 Laura E. Hall
 Tetsuya Mizuguchi
 Simon Parkin
 Jenny Jiao Hsia 
 John Ricciardi
 Holly Nielsen
 Joakim ‘Konjak’ Sandberg
 Kris Piotrowski
 Chella Ramanan
 Ben Bertoli 
 John ‘JJSignal’ James, director of 2064: Read Only Memories (2015)
 Liam Wong
 Team Cherry, developer of Hollow Knight (2017)
 Joe Sparrow
 Camille Young 
 Keith Stuart
 Doug John Miller (cover artist)

Issue 3 
From 

 Simon Parkin
 Grace Curtis
 Kyle Bosman
 Tim Schafer
 Matt Leone

Accolades

References

External links 

 Official website

Video game magazines published in the United Kingdom
Kickstarter-funded products